Adolf Gustav Friedrich Schneck (1883–1971) was a German architect and furniture designer as well as a member of the Deutscher Werkbund and teacher at the Bauhaus. He contributed two buildings to the 1927 Weissenhofsiedlung exhibit and has work in the collection of the Museum of Modern Art.

Publications 

 Das Mobel als Gebrauchs-Gegenstand (Furniture as a Commodity) (Stuttgart: Julius Hoffmann Verlag, 1929)

References 

1883 births

1971 deaths